Sprewell Bluff Park, formerly Sprewell Bluff State Park, is a 1,372 acre (5.55 km2) Upson County, Georgia , park located between Roland and Crest.  The park's location on the Flint River makes it a great place for swimming, fishing, kayaking, canoeing, and whitewater rafting.  The park also features a three-mile walking trail that winds along the bank of the river and up rocky bluffs, offering exquisite views of the park below. This park was part of The Heritage Trust Commission established by Governor Jimmy Carter in 1972. This commission was responsible for meeting the needs for recreational areas for the growing population.

History
The central river bluff was named after Jeptha Sprewell, a pioneer citizen.

The park land is owned by Georgia Power Company. The State of Georgia originally leased the land in the 1990s as a State Park. In 2013, Upson County took over management of the property.

Facilities
Boat Ramp
Picnic Area
Hiking Trail
Trading Post
Cabins
RV Sites

Annual events
Rock Skipping Contest (Labor Day)
Three Rivers Throwdown

References

External links
 

State parks of Georgia (U.S. state)
Protected areas established in 1972
Protected areas of Upson County, Georgia